Medieval Children is a book on the history of childhood written by English historian Nicholas Orme in 2001. It covers aspects of English children throughout the Middle Ages. The book addresses what is considered Philippe Ariès's central thesis in Centuries of Childhood, that there was no medieval understanding of childhood as a phase, an idea that critics have said Orme refutes successfully.

Synopsis 

 

The book uses a wide range of sources to refute Philippe Ariès's Centuries of Childhood famous theses of the medieval nonexistence of "childhood" as an idea and of apathetic medieval parenting. Orme states that childhood was a phase distinct from the rest of life, "medieval children were ourselves, five hundred or a thousand years ago" with parents who genuinely cherished and grieved for their children, similar to modern parents. The book's refutation of Ariès is diffuse, broaching his thesis but not other aspects of Centuries of Childhood. Orme uses examples from the English Middle Ages where Ariès uses the French. Orme's source materials include primers, journals, coroners' records, and shoes.

Orme shows childhood to be expensive, with clothing like bibs and swaddlebands alongside books and community expenses. Children were breastfed and given special shoes to wear and items to chew. They would dress up, accidentally die while playing, and hurt animals.

Reception 

Critics Stephen Metcalf and Benjamin Schwarz separately agreed that the book successfully dismantled Ariès's thesis, its primary goal. The Atlantics Benjamin Schwarz called the book "a model of accessible scholarly history" and lauded its illustrations for an academic work. Slates Stephen Metcalf praised the book for its scholarship and utility, but criticized the book's timing and lack of imagination. He adds that Orme's language is "phlegmatic and common-sensical" where Ariès was "oracular and tendentious", which was used to make the era appear familiar or alien, respectively. The Economist criticized the exclusion of females from the book.

References 

History books about England
2001 non-fiction books
History books about the Middle Ages
History of childhood